A plebiscite on prohibition was held in Canada on 29 September 1898, the first national referendum in the country's history. The Liberal government had made an election promise in 1896 to provide an opportunity for Canadians to register their opinions about the sale of alcohol.  The non-binding plebiscite saw 51.3% in favour of introducing prohibition, although turnout was only 44%. A majority voted for its introduction in all provinces except Quebec, where 81.2% opposed it.

Despite the majority in favour, Prime Minister Wilfrid Laurier's government chose not to introduce a federal bill on prohibition. As a result, Canadian prohibition was instead enacted through laws passed by the provinces during the first twenty years of the 20th century.

A 2012 study found that religion was by far the most important factor in determining how Canadians voted, with Evangelicals favoring prohibition, whereas Catholics and Anglicans opposed it. More urbanized districts were less likely to favor prohibition.

Results

See also
 1920 Canadian liquor plebiscite
 1919 Quebec prohibition referendum

References

Further reading

Samuel E. St. O Chapleau (1898). "Report on the prohibition plebiscite held on the 29th day of September 1898 in the Dominion of Canada". ISBN B0008D4FCS

1898 in Canada
Referendums in Canada
1898 referendums
Canadian prohibition referendums
1898 in Quebec
September 1898 events